Michel Breistroff (February 5, 1971 – July 17, 1996) was a French professional ice hockey defenceman.

Breistroff was born in Roubaix, France.  A graduate in anthropology from Harvard University, he died at 25 in the crash of TWA Flight 800 off Long Island, New York. He was playing professional ice hockey for French league team Gothiques d'Amiens at the time of his death. He also played with the France national team during the 1996 Men's World Ice Hockey Championships in Vienna.

As a passenger on TWA Flight 800, he was killed when the plane exploded shortly after takeoff in 1996. His then-fiancée, Heidi Snow, subsequently created AirCraft Casualty Emotional Support Services ("ACCESS"), an American nonprofit support group, based in New York City, which helps surviving family members of aircraft crash victims.

Playing career
 1990–1995 NCAA- Harvard University
 1995–1996 French League – Ducs d'Angers

References

External links
 
 Necrology on Time.com

1971 births
1996 deaths
Sportspeople from Roubaix
Accidental deaths in New York (state)
Ducs d'Angers players
French ice hockey defencemen
Harvard Crimson men's ice hockey players
Victims of aviation accidents or incidents in 1996
Victims of aviation accidents or incidents in the United States
TWA Flight 800